Ross Richie (born May 22, 1970) is an American comic book publisher and the founder of Boom! Studios, film producer, television producer and comic book creator. Richie was a Keynote Speaker for the 2012 Harvey Awards and a judge for the "Spirit of Comics Retailer" Eisner Award. The New York Times profiled Richie and his company Boom! Studios twice.

Early life
Richie was born in San Antonio, Texas and is a graduate of Alamo Heights High School and The University of Texas at Austin. After graduation, Richie moved to Los Angeles and found a job in the marketing department of Malibu Comics, where he worked from 1993 to 1995. While at Malibu, Richie met Andrew Cosby, who later became his business partner. After leaving Malibu, Richie worked in consulting and script reading. In 2003 he co-wrote a comic book with Keith Giffen for Image Comics, which led to him helping Dave Elliott and Garry Leach re-launch Atomeka Press in 2004. In June 2005, Richie and Cosby launched BOOM! Studios. As BOOM! CEO, Richie produced the films 2 Guns and The Empty Man. In 2021, he changed roles from CEO to chairman of the board.

List of Boom! Studios films Richie is producing
Lumberjanes
James Wan's Malignant Man
Grant Morrison's Klaus
Keith Giffen's Tag

List of Boom! Studios TV shows Richie is producing
Arash Amel's Butterfly
Nate Cosby's Cow Boy
Justin Jordan's Deep State
Gary Phillips series The Rinse
Something is Killing the Children

References 

Living people
1970 births
Comic book publishers (people)
American film producers
University of Texas at Austin alumni